Millennium is a Japanese-style role-playing video game series by Aldorlea Games. It is set in a fantasy medieval world where players take control of a young peasant girl named Marine. Several other characters join her later in the game and in the sequels. There are five games in the series.  All the games in the series were made with RPG Maker XP and are designed so they can either be played as stand-alone or importing savefiles from one game to another.

Gameplay
The series's gameplay and visuals are similar to 2D role-playing video games like the classic Final Fantasy and Dragon Quest games. The Gamesmen hailed it as a "software worthy of Genesis and Super Nintendo era gaming." It features mouse control, difficulty choice, visible or invisible monsters, in-game tutorial, and numerous sidequests. Each game can be downloaded individually, but save games can be transferred from one game to the next, allowing players to keep their inventory.

Plot

Millennium takes place in the world of Myst, divided between the rich people living in the town of Mystrock, and the poor people pushed away in the murky areas of the countryside. Marine, a daring teenager whose father is critically injured, embarks on a journey to gather 12 warriors and enter a showdown that determines the next ruler of Mystrock.

Series
There are five episodes in the series. Millennium 5 is the final episode.
 Millennium: A New Hope (2009-09-21)
 Millennium 2: Take Me Higher (2009-12-20)
 Millennium 3: Cry Wolf (2010-10-31)
 Millennium 4: Beyond Sunset (2011-08-06)
 Millennium 5: The Battle of the Millennium (2013-07-21)

Titles from the Millennium series are available for purchase on websites including: Big Fish Games, Amazon, GameStop Impulse, Yahoo! Games, and Pogo. Big Fish Games localized the game for Germany and France.

Reception

Millennium: A New Hope was given an 89 out of 100 review by RPG Fan's Neal Chandran, who opined "the art is gorgeous, the music is great, the gameplay is fun, and the characters make me want to journey with them." It was awarded Indie RPG of the Year by RPG Fan. A New Hope was given a 3 out of 5 stars review by Erin Bell of Gamezebo, who noted "Millenniums healthy number of secrets and side quests give it a nice amount of depth, with a style of gameplay that rewards people who are thorough and curious." It was given an 84 out of 100 review by The Gamesmen, with the review stating, "There is a good amount of content here to be had and it could easily be featured as a WiiWare title in the vein of Final Fantasy IV: The After Years".

References

External links
 

Fantasy video games
Indie video games
Role-playing video games
RPG Maker games
Video games featuring female protagonists